Soergelia is a genus of extinct ovibovine caprine that was common across Europe, North America and Asia in the Pleistocene epoch.

Species include:

 Soergelia brigittae 
 Soergelia minor . Found in Italy. 
 Soergelia intermedia . Found in Macedonia.
 Soergelia elisabethae 
 Soergelia mayfieldi

References

Prehistoric bovids
Prehistoric mammals of North America
Pleistocene even-toed ungulates
Pleistocene genus extinctions
Fossil taxa described in 1951
Prehistoric even-toed ungulate genera
Prehistoric mammals of Asia
Prehistoric mammals of Europe